Jeepito is a small vehicle of the Jeepney style. The company is owned by Ronald Carlton Papa Tan, better known as ‘Tonton Papa’, from Baguio. He is a former TV host, a businessman and the owner of Philippine Property Central Realty and Development Inc. Jeepito means Small Jeepney. It is currently the World's Smallest Philippine Jeepney and the only one of its kind.

Conceptualization 
Jeepito was designed in Tonton Papa's private garage by him in Baguio and then created in Mabalacat, Pampanga in another garage of his. It took 1 month for him and his co-builder/mechanic Arnel Pacia to finish the project. He used a 3- cylinder Susuki multicab engine and customized everything from scrap. It runs on gasoline as a fuel. What took long was finding a vintage Stainless horse for the hood of the jeep since the Stainless horse is already obsolete.

He spent a total of Php165,000 to build jeepney and another Php50,000 for the registration for it to be street legal.

Jeepito was  designed to be the smallest Philippine Jeepney, with a total length of 92 inches and a width of 42 inches and height of  55 inches.

TRIP ni Jeepito Philippine Tour 
Jeepito is currently touring the Philippines because of invitations by Government offices from different municipalities and cities to promote their Tourism. Jeepito also participates in Festival parades to liven up the public who is anticipating the presence of Jeepito.

Panagbenga/ Baguio Flower Festival 2016 

Jeepito participated in the 2016 Float Parade. For the parade Jeepito was adorned by Roses and Everlasting flowers. Riding Jeepito were Tonton Papa Tan and his co-hosts ‘Lester the Pester’ and ‘Carlito Romantiko’.

References

Jeep vehicles